WPVC-LP was a Progressive Talk Radio and Electronic Dance Music formatted broadcast radio station licensed to Charlottesville, Virginia, serving Charlottesville and Albemarle County in Virginia. WPVC-LP was owned and operated by Promise Land Communications.

Sign off
On June 17, 2020, the station ceased broadcasting. Promise Land Communications cited in a Facebook post "the ongoing legal challenge...by the out of state giant Saga Communications". In late 2019, Saga accused Promise Land, along with four other Charlotteville area low-power FM stations, of operating as a "de facto cluster". Saga owns six stations in the Charlottesville market. Saga has accused low-power stations of licensure violations in the past.

On June 16, 2020, station president Jeffrey Lenert turned in the license for deletion stating "As a result of the ongoing Coronavirus pandemic and recent increased costs of station ownership and operation, it has become impossible to operate station WPVC-LP in the manner that I wish." The station's license was deleted and its pending renewal dismissed on July 7 of the same year.

References

External links
 

Defunct radio stations in the United States
2015 establishments in Virginia
Talk radio stations in the United States
Radio stations established in 2015
PVC-LP
PVC-LP
Radio stations disestablished in 2020
2020 disestablishments in Virginia
PVC-LP